IV: Constitution of Treason is the fourth full-length studio album by the New Jersey heavy metal quintet God Forbid. It is a concept album telling the story of a futuristic society that destroys itself, reforms many years later, and eventually destroys itself again in the same way as originally. The band's guitarist has said that the album's basic theme is the fact that humanity in general does not seem to learn from its mistakes. Three music videos were released from this album for the tracks "The End of the World", "Chains of Humanity" and "To the Fallen Hero". There is a special edition DualDisc version of this album, with a DVD documentary about the making of IV: Constitution of Treason entitled "The Act of Treason". This is the first album to chart, peaking at number 118 on the Billboard 200 selling 8,300 copies.

Track listing

Personnel
Byron Davis – lead vocals
Doc Coyle – lead guitar, clean vocals
Dallas Coyle – rhythm guitar, clean vocals
John "Beeker" Outcalt – bass guitar
Corey Pierce – drums
Tony Schreck – keyboards, electronics and programming
Jason Suecof – additional guitars on tracks 2, 3, 6 & 7, guitar solo on "Into the Wasteland"
Kevin Coyle (aka "Dad Forbid") – piano outro on "The Lonely Dead" 
Brian Bonilla – spoken word on "Welcome to the Apocalypse (Preamble)"
Eric Rachel - mixing
Roger Lian - mastering

References

2005 albums
God Forbid albums
Century Media Records albums
Albums produced by Jason Suecof
Concept albums